A facemask (also referred to as a protraction facemask, orthopedic facemask, or reverse-pull headgear) is a type of an orthodontic headgear used to treat underbite and other malocclusions where the upper jaw is too far backwards. A metal bar sits in front of the patients face with support from the forehead and chin. Elastics are connected to the metal bar and the teeth - directly through the lips / mouth of the patient. The elastics apply forward and downward pressure on the upper jaw. Thus the force direction is the opposite from a standard headgear which is why this appliance is also known as a reverse-pull-headgear. 

This facemask appliance needs to worn by the patient for between 14 and 16 hours daily.

Additional images

References

Orthodontic appliances